David Dhalatnghu Gulpilil   (1 July 1953 – 29 November 2021), known professionally as David Gulpilil and posthumously (at his family's request, to avoid naming the dead) as David Dalaithngu for three days, was an Indigenous Australian actor and dancer, known for the films Walkabout, Storm Boy, Crocodile Dundee, Rabbit-Proof Fence and The Tracker.

He was one of the Yolngu people and was raised in a traditional lifestyle in Arnhem Land, in northern Australia, and was a skilled dancer as a young man when British director Nicolas Roeg recognised his talent. He also made several appearances on stage. He was honoured with numerous awards for individual films and for lifetime achievement, and also published books and artworks.

Early life and education
Gulpilil was probably born in 1953, although he stated in the 2021 documentary about his life, My Name is Gulpilil, that he did not know how old he was. Local missionaries recorded his birth on 1 July 1953, based on "guesswork". He was a man of the Mandjalpingu (Djilba) clan of the Yolngu people, who are an Aboriginal people of Arnhem Land in the Northern Territory of Australia.

As a young boy, Gulpilil was an accomplished hunter, tracker, and ceremonial dancer. Gulpilil spent his childhood in the bush, outside the range of non-Aboriginal influences and did not set eyes on a white man until he was 8 years old. He received a traditional upbringing in the care of his family, until the death of his parents, after which he attended the school at Maningrida in North East Arnhem Land, where he was assigned the name "David". When he came of age, Gulpilil was initiated into the Mandhalpuyngu tribal group. His skin group totemic animal was the kingfisher (the meaning of the name Gulpilil) and his homeland was Marwuyu.

After appearing in his first film, Walkabout (1971), Gulipilil became fluent in English, adding to his linguistic ability in several Aboriginal languages.

Career

Film and television
In 1969, Gulpilil's skill as a tribal dancer caught the attention of British filmmaker Nicolas Roeg, who had come to Maningrida scouting locations for a forthcoming film. Roeg promptly cast the 16-year-old unknown to play a principal role in his internationally acclaimed motion picture Walkabout, released in 1971. Before this, any portrayal of an Aboriginal character in Australia had been played by a white actor in blackface. This was also groundbreaking, as it was the first time that an Aboriginal character had been portrayed as sexually attractive. Gulpilil's on-screen charisma, combined with his acting and dancing skills, was such that he became an instant national and international celebrity. He travelled internationally, mingled with prominent people, and was presented to heads of state. During these travels to promote the film, he met and was impressed with John Lennon, Bob Marley, Bruce Lee, Marlon Brando, and Jimi Hendrix. He taught Bob Marley how to play the didgeridoo, while Marley introduced him to "ganja".

Gulpilil appeared in many more films and television productions. He played a lead role in the commercially successful and critically acclaimed Storm Boy (1976). He "dominated" the film The Last Wave (1977), with his performance as tribal Aboriginal man Chris Lee.

A documentary about his life, Gulpilil: One Red Blood, was aired on ABC Television in 2003.  The title comes from a quote by Gulpilil: "We are all one blood. No matter where we are from, we are all one blood, the same".

Gulpilil was a major creative influence throughout his life in both dance and film. He initiated and narrated the film Ten Canoes which won a Special Jury Prize at the 2006 Cannes Festival. The prize-winning, low-budget film, based on 1,000-year-old traditional story of misplaced love and revenge, features non-professional Aboriginal actors speaking their local language. Gulpilil collaborated with the director, Rolf de Heer, urging him to make the film, and although he ultimately withdrew from a central role in the project for "complex reasons," Gulpilil also provided the voice of the storyteller for the film. De Heer had directed Gulpilil in another film, The Tracker (2002).

In 2007, he starred in Richard Friar's hour-long independent documentary, Think About It! which was focussed on Indigenous rights and the anti-war movement and included commentary from former Prime Minister Malcolm Fraser, former Greens leader Bob Brown, and David Hicks, then a detainee at Guantanamo Bay detention camp.

In 2014, he again collaborated with De Heer, this time sharing on screenwriting credits for Charlie's Country. The film won several awards, including Best Actor in Un Certain Regard at the Cannes Film Festival.
 
In 2015, Gulpilil appeared in the documentary Another Country directed by Molly Reynolds. In this film, Gulpilil narrates the story of his life, from when he was a child living on country, the arrival of the first white men ("ghosts"), in the form of missionaries, through The Intervention and the introduction of the BasicsCard, often making serious criticisms hidden beneath his trademark humour.

Gulpilil again worked with Reynolds when she directed a documentary about his life, My Name Is Gulpilil, which premiered at the 2021 Adelaide Festival.

Gulpilil was renowned for portraying Aboriginal culture before it became threatened by the white civilisations, though the irony is that he became divorced from his own culture by doing so. He felt that he was stretched somewhere between the two, with "one tiptoe in champage and caviar, and the other in the dirt of his Dreamtime".

Stage

In March 2004, he performed in the autobiographical stage production, Gulpilil at the Adelaide Festival of Arts, to standing ovations. This work, co-written with Reg Cribb, and directed by Neil Armfield, was based on stories of his life assembled into a script. These included tales from the making of Walkabout, performing at Buckingham Palace, and inadvertently causing a bomb scare at Cannes. The show was later staged in Brisbane and Sydney.
He also performed on stage in The Cradle of Hercules at the Sydney Opera House in 1974;  the Commonwealth Gala Performance in Brisbane in 1982 (in front of Queen Elizabeth II and the Duke of Edinburgh, Prince Philip); the Message Sticks Film Festival in Sydney in 2002.

Dance
Perhaps the most renowned traditional dancer in Australia, Gulpilil organised troupes of dancers and musicians and performed at festivals throughout the country, including the prestigious Darwin Australia Day Eisteddfod dance competition, which he won four times. In November 1997, Gulipilil's dance troupe performed at the second National Aboriginal Dance Conference in Adelaide (hosted by the National Aboriginal Dance Council Australia (NADCA)), at which cultural and intellectual property rights and copyright issues for Australian Indigenous dancers were discussed. A free concert was given in Rymill Park / Murlawirrapurka. The troupe was given a  grant from the Northern Territory Government to attend the third conference in Sydney in 1999.

Writing and painting
In addition to his career in dance, music, film and television, Gulpilil was also an acclaimed storyteller. He wrote the text for two volumes of children's stories based on Yolngu beliefs. These books also feature photographs and drawings by Australian artists, and convey Gulpilil's reverence for the landscape, people and traditional culture of his homeland.

King brown snake with blue tongue lizard at Gulparil waterhole, painted by Gulpilil in 2013–14, is in the Art Gallery of South Australia's collection.

Recognition and awards
Gulpilil was appointed a Member of the Order of Australia (AM) in 1987, and the Centenary Medal in 2001.

He twice received the AACTA/AFI Award for Best Actor in a Leading Role, for The Tracker in 2002 and Charlie's Country in 2014.  He was also nominated for this award in 1977 for Storm Boy.  Gulpilil was nominated for the AFI Award for Best Actor in a Supporting Role for Rabbit-Proof Fence in 2002. In 2003, he was awarded the inaugural Don Dunstan Award at the Adelaide Film Festival.

He was nominated for the Helpmann Award for Best Male Actor in a Play in 2004 for the stage production Gulpilil. A portrait of Gulpilil by Craig Ruddy won the 2004 Archibald Prize, Australia's best-known art prize.

In 2013 Gulpilil was the recipient of the Red Ochre Award, which is awarded annually by the Australia Council for the Arts to an outstanding Indigenous Australian (Aboriginal Australian or Torres Strait Islander) artist for lifetime achievement.

In May 2014, Gulpilil won a Best Actor award at the Cannes Film Festival for his performance in Rolf de Heer's film Charlie's Country. The award was in the Un Certain Regard section, a part of the festival that emphasises original, individual points of view and innovative film-making.

In 2019, Gulpilil was honoured with the lifetime achievement award at the 2019 NAIDOC Awards, and the Premier's Award for Lifetime Achievement in the South Australian Ruby Awards.

In June 2021, Ngarrindjeri-Arrernte artist Thomas Readett created a huge permanent mural on the eastern wall of the Tandanya National Aboriginal Cultural Institute in Adelaide. Featuring hand-painted black-and-white images representing Gulpilil's early career and later life, the mural was commissioned by ABCG Film, in partnership with Tandanya, Arts South Australia, Department of the Premier and Cabinet and Screen Australia.

During the Vision Splendid Outback Film Festival at Winton, Queensland in June 2021, Gulpilil was honoured with a star on Winton's Walk of Fame.

In August 2021, Tandanya mounted an exhibition entitled Djungi Gulpilil (Gulpilil family), featuring the work of many artists in his family, including his twin sister, one of his wives and his brother, as well as his own paintings. The exhibition was expressly created to honour and celebrate his life, and to bring him comfort as he is being treated a long way from home, yearning for "culture, language and kin".

At the 11th AACTA Awards, to be held on 8 December 2021, Gulpilil will be officially awarded the Longford Lyell Award for his contribution to the Australian film industry; he had informally received the award at his home a month earlier. His face will be projected onto the Sydney Opera House in the evening of the award ceremony.

Later life and death 
Gulpilil was diagnosed with terminal lung cancer in 2017, and retired from acting in 2019. His illness prevented him from attending the 2019 NAIDOC Awards, where he was recognised with the lifetime achievement award.

Gulpilil died at his home in Murray Bridge, South Australia, on 29 November 2021. Following his death, his family requested that he be referred to as David Dalaithngu for a period of time to avoid naming the dead, and many news articles about his death refrained from using the actor's professional name, while warning that the articles contained his name and image.

Tributes were published in Australia by political leaders, including Minister for Indigenous Australians Ken Wyatt, federal opposition leader Anthony Albanese, and South Australian premier Steven Marshall; actors, including Hugh Jackman; film critics; and community elders and relatives, including Witiyana Marika. Overseas news outlets also published lengthy tributes and obituaries.

On 2 December 2021, a statement was posted by Tandanya on Facebook on behalf of the Yolngu community and Gulpilil's kin:
The announcement was also reported in newspapers.

Personal life and family
Gulpilil suffered from alcoholism having been introduced to grog during filming of Walkabout. In later life, it led to several clashes with the law. In 2006, Gulpilil was charged with carrying an offensive weapon after an altercation at the house of a friend in Darwin, when Gulpilil had allegedly armed himself with a machete after he and his wife had been asked to leave the home by the homeowners, who had allegedly armed themselves with a totem pole and a garden hoe. However, he was found not guilty after the judge accepted that the machete was used for cultural purposes, including carving didgeridoos, and had not been intended for use as a weapon.

On 30 March 2007, a Darwin magistrate imposed a 12-month domestic violence order against Gulpilil over an incident which took place against his wife, Miriam Ashley, on 28 December 2006, and he was ordered to stay away from her while drinking. In December 2010, Gulpilil was charged with aggravated assault against Ashley, with the court hearing that he had thrown a broom at her, fracturing her arm. In September 2011, he was found guilty and sentenced to twelve months in Berrimah Prison in Darwin. After this stint in prison, he finally got sober.

Gulpilil's other wives or partners included Airlie Thomas and Robyn Djunginy. Two of his daughters are Phoebe Marson and Makia McLaughlin. Seven children survived him: Jida (a musician and actor), Milan, Makia, Andrew, Jamie, Phoebe and Malakai. Witiyana Marika, Yolngu elder, musician and band member of Yothu Yindi, is his son by lore.

Several members of his family are artists, including his twin sister (yapa), Mary Dhapalany, a leading weaver; his brother, Peter Minygululu, known for his story-telling and detailed artworks; and former wife Robyn Djunginy, who was known for her bottle paintings. His nephew (waku), Bobby Bununggurr, is a singer, dancer, law man and reconciliation advocate. During the 1970s and 1980s, the two men travelled widely together, performing, dancing and singing.

Filmography

Film

Television

Books

Explanatory notes

References

External links
 
 
 
 

1953 births
2021 deaths
Best Actor AACTA Award winners
Australian male dancers
Australian male film actors
Australian people convicted of assault
Indigenous Australian male actors
Members of the Order of Australia
People from the Northern Territory
Recipients of the Centenary Medal
Yolngu people
Deaths from lung cancer
Deaths from cancer in South Australia
AACTA Award winners
Indigenous Australian dancers